Judy Woods is a complex of woodlands in Bradford, West Yorkshire, England.  Individual woodlands in the complex include Jagger Park Wood, Royds Hall Great Wood, Old Hanna Wood and Low Wood.

The woodlands are situated on Coal Measures, and present in the woodlands are numerous bell pits, which have been used to provide coal.

The woods are named after Judy North, who lived nearby in the 1850s and 1860s, and whose family had managed part of the site since the early 19th century.

References 

Geography of the City of Bradford
Parks and commons in Bradford
Forests and woodlands of West Yorkshire